Richard Bedull (fl. 1388), of Reading, Berkshire, was an English politician.

Career
Bedull was Mayor of Reading in 1379–80. He was a Member (MP) of the Parliament of England for Reading in February 1388.

References

Year of birth missing
Year of death missing
English MPs February 1388
14th-century English politicians
People from Reading, Berkshire
Mayors of Reading, Berkshire
Members of the Parliament of England (pre-1707) for Reading